Déjate Llevar may refer to:

Films and television
Déjate Llevar, the Spanish title of the 2006 film Take the Lead directed by Liz Friedlander, and starring Antonio Banderas

Music
Déjate Llevar, 2018 album by Catalina Palacios
"Déjate Llevar", the Spanish version of the Ricky Martin song "It's Alright"
"Déjate Llevar", 2006 song by the Spanish pop band La Oreja de Van Gogh
"Déjate llevar", 2011 song by the Mexican band Reik from their 2011 album Peligro
"Déjate Llevar", 2017 song by Juan Magán, Belinda, Manuel Turizo, Snova, B-Case